David Alexander Kerr (January 11, 1909 – May 11, 1978) was a Canadian NHL goaltender who played for the Montreal Maroons, New York Americans and New York Rangers.

Playing career
He played amateur hockey before joining the NHL, winning the Allan Cup in 1930 with the Montreal AAA senior men's team.

Kerr was most notable for his time with the New York Rangers.  His four shutouts in a single playoff season in 1937 is a Rangers record (since tied by Mike Richter). In 1937-38, Kerr was selected to the NHL second All-Star team.  Kerr won a Stanley Cup with the New York Rangers in 1939-40. That year, he won the Vezina Trophy for a Rangers team that led the league in goals allowed, and had a 19-game unbeaten streak (14-0-5).  He was also selected to the NHL first All-Star team that year.  As a Ranger, he only missed one game between 1934 and 1941, and started every game for five straight seasons (1936-1941).

Kerr also was the NHL season leader in most games played by a goaltender (1936–37, 1937–38, 1938–39, 1939–40, and 1940–41), most shutouts (1937–38 and 1939–40), most playoff games played by a goaltender, most playoff minutes played by a goaltender, most playoff wins, most playoff shutouts, and lowest playoff goals-against average (all 1937 and 1940).

Kerr was the second hockey player on the cover of Time magazine, doing so on the March 14, 1938 edition.

Awards and achievements
Allan Cup (1930)
Vezina Trophy (1940)
NHL first All-Star team goalie (1940)
NHL second All-Star team goalie (1938)
Stanley Cup (1940)
In the 2009 book 100 Ranger Greats, the authors ranked Kerr at No. 19 all-time of the roughly 900 New York Rangers who had played during the first 83 seasons (1926–27 to 2008–09) of the franchise‘s existence.

Career statistics

Regular season and playoffs

References

External links

https://web.archive.org/web/20060908011344/http://www.newyorkrangers.com/tradition/alumnispotlight.asp?Alumni=Kerr

1909 births
1978 deaths
Canadian ice hockey goaltenders
Montreal Maroons players
New York Americans players
New York Rangers players
Philadelphia Arrows players
Ice hockey people from Toronto
Stanley Cup champions
Vezina Trophy winners
Windsor Bulldogs (1929–1936) players